Billy Joe Royal was an American country soul artist. His discography consists of 14 studio albums and 37 singles. Of his 37 singles, 16 charted on the U.S. Billboard Hot 100 chart between 1965 and 1978 and 15 charted on the U.S. Billboard Hot Country Songs chart between 1985 and 1992.

Albums

Studio albums

Compilations

Singles

1960s — 1970s

1980s — 2000s

Guest singles

Music videos

Notes

References

External links

Country music discographies
Discographies of American artists